A list of animated feature films first released in 1995.

Highest-grossing animated films of the year

See also
 List of animated television series of 1995

References

 Feature films
1995
1995-related lists